The vice president of Chile is a temporary post provided by the Constitution of Chile. The "vice president" is a person who fulfills the duties of the president of Chile when cases of incapacity and vacancy occur. This post is held by the Minister of the Interior and Public Security or by the next minister of the government, in the order of succession, in case of the former's absence.

It was also a permanent political position in Chile from 1826 to 1833.

In 1826, jointly with the establishment of the title of President of the Republic, the position of Vice President was created, whose function was to replace the President in the cases of illness, absence and others. Agustín Eyzaguirre was elected as the first vice president in the election of 1826. Francisco Antonio Pinto was designated in the position in the election of following year.

The Constitution of 1828, the only Chilean constitution that established the vicepresidency as a permanent position, provided that in case of death or physical or moral impossibility of the president, he would replace him in his post. The required qualities were the same as those required from president. The appointment of Joaquín Vicuña as vice president, after the election of 1829, the first under the rule of the Charter of 1828, was the object of a great controversy and is considered one of the triggers of the Revolution of 1829. The permanent position of vice president was abolished with the 1833 Constitution, Diego Portales being the last to occupy it.

Since then, the title of "Vice President" is only used for the first individual in the order of succession to discharge the duties of the president in case of temporary impediment or vacancy. The "Vice President", in the performance of their duties, has all the powers that the Constitution confers on the President.

Vice Presidents

References

Politics of Chile
Government of Chile
Chile
Vice presidents of Chile